The 2014–15 First League of the Republika Srpska was the twentieth season of the First League of the Republika Srpska, the second tier football league of Bosnia and Herzegovina, since its original establishment and the thirteenth as a second tier league. It will begin on 18 August 2014 and end on 6 June 2015; a winter break where no matches are played will be in effect between 8 November 2014 and 13 March 2015. FK Drina Zvornik were the last champions, having won their one championship title in the 2013–14 season and earning a promotion to Premier League of Bosnia and Herzegovina.

Fourteen clubs are participating in this session, ten returning from the previous session, one relegated from Premier League of Bosnia and Herzegovina, two promoted from two regional Second League of the Republika Srpska.

Changes from last season

Team changes

From First League of the RS
Promoted to Premier League
 Drina Zvornik

Relegated to two of 3 respective regional Second League of the RS
 Rudar Ugljevik (Second League of the RS – East)
 Modriča Maxima (Second League of the RS – West)
 Sloga Doboj (Second League of the RS – West)

To First League of RS
Relegated from Premier League
 Rudar Prijedor
 Leotar

Promoted from two regional Second League of the RS
 Vlasenica (Second League of the RS – East)
 Krupa (Second League of the RS - West)
 Tekstilac (Second League of the RS - West)

Stadions and locations

League table

Season statistics

Top goalscorers

See also
2014–15 Premier League of Bosnia and Herzegovina
2014–15 First League of the Federation of Bosnia and Herzegovina
2014–15 Bosnia and Herzegovina Football Cup

References

Bos
2014–15 in Bosnia and Herzegovina football
First League of the Republika Srpska seasons